The 2019 Porsche Mobil 1 Supercup was the 27th Porsche Supercup season. It began on 12 May at Circuit de Catalunya and ended on 27 October at Autódromo Hermanos Rodríguez, after ten scheduled races, all of which were support events for the 2019 Formula One season.

Teams and drivers

Race calendar and results

Championship standings

Drivers' Championship

‡ No points were awarded at the Hockenheimring round as less than 50% of the scheduled race distance was completed.

Notes
† – Drivers did not finish the race, but were classified as they completed over 75% of the race distance.

^ – Drivers took part in the races with different competition numbers

Notes

References

External links
 
 Porsche Mobil 1 Supercup Online Magazine (German & English)

Porsche Supercup seasons
Porsche Supercup